The 2018–19 Prva A Liga, known as Erste košarkaške lige by sponsorship reasons, is the 13th season of the Montenegrin Basketball League, the top tier basketball league on Montenegro. Mornar is the defending champion.

Competition format
Nine of the eleven teams that play the league join the regular season and play a two-round robin competition where the six first qualified teams join the Super Liga with the two 2018–19 ABA League teams (Budućnost Voli and Mornar). The last qualified team would play a relegation playoff against the second qualified of the Prva B.

Teams

Regular season

League table

Results

Super Liga

League table

Results

Relegation group

League table

Results

Playoffs
Semifinals will be played in a best-of-three-games format, while the finals in a best-of-five one.

Semifinals

|}

Finals

|}

Relegation playoffs

Montenegrin clubs in European competitions

References

External links
Montenegrin Basketball Federation official website

Prva A liga seasons
Montenegro
Prva A liga